Patrick W. Ryan (died 26 December 1993) was an Irish politician. He was an independent member of Seanad Éireann from 1961 to 1973. He was elected to the 10th Seanad in 1961 by the Agricultural Panel. He was re-elected at the 1965 and 1969 Seanad elections but lost his seat at the 1973 election.

References

Year of birth missing
1993 deaths
Irish farmers
Members of the 10th Seanad
Members of the 11th Seanad
Members of the 12th Seanad
Independent members of Seanad Éireann